The 2009 Oceania Sevens Championship was the second edition of the Oceania Sevens. It was held in Papeete, Tahiti from 12 to 14 November. Samoa were the eventual winner.

Tournament

Group phase

Finals 
Plate

Cup

References 

2009
2009 rugby sevens competitions
2009 in Oceanian rugby union